The genovino was a gold coin used in the Republic of Genoa from 1252 to 1415.

History 
New supplies of gold arrived in Western Europe from Sudan, via caravans from the Sahara, which allowed Florence and Genoa to inaugurate, from the 13th century, the minting of these currencies.

The genovino was issued in Genoa for the first time in 1252, shortly before the Florentine currency, and will be issued until 1415. Next to the genovino are also struck values equivalent to its eighth (ottavino) and its quarter (quartarola).

Its obverse represented the door of a castle, typical of medieval Genoese coins, and around the inscription + IANUA, that means door in Latin which resonates like the name of the city, and which had already been used in the first currencies.

After 1339, with Simone Boccanegra, the first Doge of Genoa, the doge's indication began with the inscription: X DVX IANVENSIVM PRIMVS.

References 

Republic of Genoa
Obsolete Italian currencies
Medieval currencies
Coins of Italy